Prince Samaya Vudhirodom (13 September 1888 – 9 December 1889), was a Prince of Siam (later Thailand) and a member of the Siamese Royal Family. He was a son of Chulalongkorn, King Rama V of Siam.

Her mother was Chao Chom Manda Phrom (daughter of Phraya Phitsanuloka Thibodi), he had 3 siblings; 2 elder sisters, and 1 younger sister:
 Princess Prabha Bannabilaya (13 August 1885 – 8 September 1948)
 Princess Prabai Bannapilas (13 August 1885 – 17 September 1886), twin sister of Princess Prabha Bannabilaya.
 Princess Vapi Busbakara (25 June 1891 – 15 December 1982)

Prince Samaya Vudhirodom died at the age of 1 on 9 December 1889,.

Ancestry

1888 births
1889 deaths
19th-century Thai royalty who died as children
Thai male Phra Ong Chao
Children of Chulalongkorn
19th-century Chakri dynasty
Sons of kings